Charles Kynard is an album by organist Charles Kynard which was recorded in 1971 and released on the Mainstream label.

Reception 

Michael G. Nastos of Allmusic said, "Kynard's best combo effort. Shows him in a more favorable light as a soul-jazz proprietor".

Track listing 
All compositions by Richard Fritz except as indicated
 "El Torro Poo Poo" – 3:10
 "Greeze" – 4:37
 "She" – 6:31
 "Grits" – 6:42
 "Greens" – 4:37
 "Nightwood" – 2:26
 "It's Too Late" (Carole King, Toni Stern) – 9:18

Personnel 
Charles Kynard – organ
Ernie Watts – tenor saxophone
Billy Fender – guitar
Carol Kaye – electric bass
James Gadson – drums
King Errisson – congas

References 

Charles Kynard albums
1971 albums
Mainstream Records albums
Albums produced by Bob Shad